Ambición  is a 1939 Argentine film directed by Adelqui Migliar and written by José B. Cairola. The film starred Floren Delbene and Fanny Navarro. It was the first film of Armando Bo.

Cast
Floren Delbene
Fanny Navarro
Alberto Anchart
Enrique Arellano
Armando Bo
Gracia del Río
Néstor Deval
Rafael Frontaura
Elsa Martinez
Adolfo Meyer
Mary Parets
Carlos Perelli
Eduardo Primo
Mercedes Simone

Sources

External links

1939 films
1930s Spanish-language films
Argentine black-and-white films
Films directed by Adelqui Migliar
Argentine drama films
1939 drama films
1930s Argentine films